Coțofenii din Dos is a commune in Dolj County, Oltenia, Romania with a population of 2,573 people. It is composed of three villages: Coțofenii din Dos, Mihăița and Potmelțu.

References

Communes in Dolj County
Localities in Oltenia